Arthur C. Gossard was a professor of materials and electrical engineering at the University of California, Santa Barbara. In 1982, he co-discovered the fractional quantum Hall effect. His research is related to molecular beam epitaxy (MBE). He has a doctorate in physics from UC Berkeley. After university, he joined Bell Labs. 

In 1987, he was elected a member of the US National Academy of Engineering for contributions to the study of the physics of ultra-thin semiconducting layers through molecular beam epitaxy, leading to new physics and new devices. He was also a member of the US National Academy of Sciences.

In 2016, Gossard was named as a recipient of a National Medal of Technology and Innovation.
He died on 26 June 2022.

Lectures 

 1991 - Heterostructures for new dimensions of electron confinement Lecture sponsored by the Dept. of Electrical and Computer engineering, University of California, San Diego. Electrical and Computer Engineering Distinguished Lecture Series. Digital Object Made Available by Special Collections & Archives, UC San Diego.

References

External links
 UC Santa Barbara faculty profile

American materials scientists
Members of the United States National Academy of Engineering
University of California, Santa Barbara faculty
University of California, Berkeley alumni
Members of the United States National Academy of Sciences
Oliver E. Buckley Condensed Matter Prize winners
National Medal of Technology recipients
Fellows of the American Physical Society